McNear may refer to:
McNear, California, former name of McNears Beach, California
Howard McNear